The Women's 78 kg competition at the 2019 World Judo Championships was held on 30 August 2019.

Results

Finals

Repechage

Pool A

Pool B

Pool C

Pool D

Prize money
The sums listed bring the total prizes awarded to 57,000$ for the individual event.

References

External links
 
 Draw

W78
2019
World W78